The Port of Vienna is the largest Austrian river port and one of the largest ports on the Danube River, with a total annual traffic capacity of around 12 million tonnes of cargo.

Statistics
In 2007 the Port of Vienna handled 12,000,000 tonnes of cargo and 323,000 TEU's making it the busiest cargo and container port in Austria and one of the largest in Central Europe.

* figures in millions of tonnes

Terminals

Container terminal
The terminal was opened in 2000 and has a storage area of 60,000 m2.

Automobile terminal
The cars terminal is one of the largest in Central Europe used for imports of new cars and can accommodate 10,000 cars at once on a 160,000m2 plot of land.

General cargo
The general cargo terminal has a storage area of 270,000 m2.

Passenger terminal
The Port of Vienna has one of the largest passenger terminals on the Danube River; it handled 305,000 passengers in 2007.

References

Ports and harbours of Austria
River ports